Witness in the Dark is a 1959 British crime drama film directed by Wolf Rilla, and starring Patricia Dainton, Conrad Phillips, Madge Ryan and Nigel Green.
It was produced by Patricia Dainton's husband, Norman Williams (producer).

Premise
Jane Pringle (Patricia Dainton), a blind telephone operator, is going to visit her elderly neighbour Mrs Temple (Enid Lorimer) when she brushes against a man who tries to sneak past her on the stairs and does not respond when she asks who is there. Jane goes up to Mrs Temple's flat and finds her murdered. The man on the stairs (Nigel Green) was searching for a valuable brooch that Jane had advised Mrs Temple to find a hiding place for. Later, after Jane has inherited the brooch from Mrs Temple, she finds herself targeted by the intruder.

Cast 
 Patricia Dainton as Jane Pringle
 Conrad Phillips as Inspector Coates
 Madge Ryan as Mrs Finch
 Nigel Green as the Intruder
 Enid Lorimer as Mrs Temple
 Richard O'Sullivan as Don Theobald
 Stuart Saunders as Mr Finch
 Noel Trevarthen as Sergeant Jones
 Maureen O'Reilly as Sophie Trellan
 Ian Colin as Superintendent Thompson
 Larry Burns as Carter
 Ann Wrigg as Woman Neighbour
 Frazer Hines as Newsboy

Recent assessments of the film
According to the Radio Times, "Coming between Bachelor of Hearts and Village of the Damned, this is one of Wolf Rilla's lesser efforts. However, he conjures up a pleasing sense of menace that anticipates Wait until Dark as he subjects blind telephonist Patricia Dainton to the murderous machinations of a prowler. As so often in thrillers of this kind, much depends on contrivance and the script might have concealed its hand with a little more artfulness. But Dainton's performance is superior to that seen in the majority of British Bs"; TV Guide on the other hand, finds the film "standard and predictable," though "Dainton gives a nice performance". NoirWorthWatching describes the film as "efficiently directed," and concludes that "in many ways [it] is more of a movie than its 62-minute length might suggest. Very much worth watching."

References

External links
 

British crime drama films
1959 films
1959 crime drama films
Films directed by Wolf Rilla
British black-and-white films
1950s English-language films
1950s British films